Luukkonen is a Russian surname. Notable people with the surname include:

Aleksei Lyubushkin (born 1990), Russian football defender
Ilya Lyubushkin (born 1994), Russian ice hockey defenceman

Russian-language surnames